TV Man or Five Piece Cube with Strange Hole is a 1993 mountain rose colored granite and steel sculpture by David Bakalar, installed on the Massachusetts Institute of Technology (MIT) campus, in Cambridge, Massachusetts, United States. The five abstract, organic elements of the sculpture reflect the influences of Constructivism and Surrealism on the artist's style. The geometric forms use negative space to help compose an anthropomorphic ensemble.

See also
 1993 in art

References

1993 sculptures
Granite sculptures in Massachusetts
Massachusetts Institute of Technology campus
Outdoor sculptures in Cambridge, Massachusetts